Al Mina'a Stadium is a multi-use stadium in Basra, Iraq. It is currently used mostly for football matches and served as the home stadium of Al Minaa. The stadium holds 30,000 people. 

Football venues in Iraq
Al-Mina'a SC
Buildings and structures in Basra